Brigham is a surname. Notable people with the surname include:

Asa Brigham (1788–1844), Texas politician and businessman
Albert Perry Brigham (1855–1932), American geologist and clergyman.
Amariah Brigham (1798–1849), American psychiatrist
Bud Brigham (born 1961), American billionaire oil and gas developer 
Carl Brigham (1890–1943), American psychologist at Princeton University, developer of the progenitor of the SAT test
Charles Brigham (1841–1925), American architect
Dorcas Brigham (1896-1986), American botanist, horticulturist
Elijah Brigham Bryant (born 1995), American basketball player for Maccabi Tel Aviv of the Israeli Premier League and the EuroLeague
Harold Brigham (1914–1978), English footballer who played for Nottingham Forest. Stoke City and York City
Jeff Brigham, American baseball player
Lincoln F. Brigham (1819–1895), American judge
Louise Brigham (1875-1956), American designer and teacher
Paul Brigham (1746–1824), Revolutionary soldier and American politician
Peter Bent Brigham (1807–1877), American businessman and philanthropist
Philip Brigham, Canadian rock singer, composer and guitarist
Robert Brigham (disambiguation), multiple people
William Tufts Brigham (1841–1926), American botanist and ethnologist, first director of the Bernice P. Bishop Museum (1898–1918)